Land and the Ruling Class in Hong Kong ( or "property hegemony") is a book written by Alice Poon Wai-han, a former personal assistant of Kwok Tak-seng, the late co-founder of Hong Kong-based conglomerate Sun Hung Kai Properties. She also worked for another Hong Kong-based conglomerate, Kerry Properties. The book was about some real estate tycoon families of the former British colony, especially Li Ka-shing family, Kwok Tak-seng family, Lee Shau-kee family, Cheng Yu-tung family, Pao Yue-kong family and Kadoorie family, who controlled "property-cum-utility/public services conglomerates" of Hong Kong.

The book was written in Richmond, British Columbia. Poon resided in Steveston, a neighbourhood in the city.

According to a book review, as of December 2010, in less than 6 months of publishing, the Traditional Chinese edition had been re-printed 7 times to the 8th print. The first Traditional Chinese edition also contained revised and updated materials that did not appear in the first English edition.

After the publication of the Traditional Chinese translation, it popularised the Chinese book title  as a term to describe the real estate tycoons of Hong Kong, according to Hong Sir in his column in Apple Daily.

The original English edition was reviewed by Canada Book Review Annual (CBRA) as a Canadian book. CBRA "was founded to provide Canadians with an evaluative guide to all the English-language and Canadian-authored scholarly, reference, trade, children's, and youth books published in Canada each year."

The Traditional Chinese translation was also reviewed by 	Guangzhou-based Southern Metropolis Daily in 2011, with title Dào dǐ shì shéi zài kòng zhì xiāng gǎng ?. Since Nanfang Media Group, the publisher of Southern Metropolis Daily, is a state-owned media, the review was also interpreted by a Shenzhen-based academician, as an opinion from the central Chinese government regarding the tycoons themselves. According to the book review, the Simplified Chinese edition had some chapters censored.

Editions

See also
 Four big families of Hong Kong § Other definitions, a concept coined to some notable families of Hong Kong, but the members change from time to time

References

Land developers of Hong Kong
Canadian non-fiction books
Hong Kong non-fiction books
English-language books
Chinese-language books
2005 non-fiction books